Men of Honor is a 2002 drama film.

Men of Honor may also refer to:

 Men of Honor (Adrenaline Mob album)
 Men of Honor (Jeremy Pelt album)
 Made man, in Mafia terms